Kissing is a municipality in the Aichach-Friedberg district, in Bavaria, Germany. It is located just 10 km (6.2 mi) south of Augsburg and has about 11,200 inhabitants (2007).

In even earlier times, around 500, there was a thing hill nearby, which was later swept away by the floods of the river Lech.

The surname Kissinger (as in Henry Kissinger) means inhabitant of Kissing or Kissingen.

References